The Henokiens is an association of companies that have been continuously operating and remain family-owned for 200 years or more, and whose descendants still operate at management level. It derives its name from the biblical patriarch Enoch (Hénoch in French), who lived for 365 years before he was taken by God instead of dying.

Founded in 1981 by the then-chairman of Marie Brizard, the association started with 4 French members and now counts 47. Its stated objective and raison d'être is to promote long-term decision making, notably through its Da Vinci Prize.

Its oldest member is the Japanese Hōshi ryokan (founded 717), and the most recent the Austrian jewellery firm A. E. Köchert (founded 1814).

Members
The association includes 44 members. Marie Brizard, having been bought by an investment fund in 2000, is no longer a member.

See also
 List of oldest companies
 List of oldest banks in continuous operation
 List of oldest companies in Australia
 List of oldest companies in the United States

References

External links

Trade associations based in France
Corporate groups
Henokiens companies